Beverley Randolph (January 20, 1923 – April 4, 1958), United States Navy, was a decorated Naval Aviator who is most noted for sacrificing his life to steer his disabled Grumman F-11 away from a neighborhood to save the people below.

Randolph flew over 23 combat missions during the Korean War with VF-154.

Career

U.S. Naval Academy Midshipman
Randolph was on the Battalion Track and Bowling team and was also on the Reception Committee. He graduated on the year of the Academy's centennial, in 1945.

Naval Aviator
Randolph received his "wings of gold" as a Naval Aviator in 1947.  He attended the United States Naval Test Pilot School at the Naval Air Test Center, NAS Patuxent River, Maryland with the TPS Class 16, the same class as Vice Admiral William Porter Lawrence.

Test pilot and accident
A letter from Captain F.B. Gilkerson to Randolph's parents unofficially addresses the events of the accident. The letter states the findings are based on circumstantial evidence based on the wreckage, witness interviews, and transcribed tape from radio transmissions. The findings are as follows:
About five minutes before the crash, Bev reported to the control tower and requested landing instructions. About two minutes later he reported in a very calm voice that he had an "indication" of fire in the afterburner section of the airplane. The tower cleared him to land on runway 6 and asked his position. Bev reported that he was 4 miles East and the tower offered runway 31 if desired. Bev said he would try to get in on runway 6. The first indication that anyone had of real trouble came about a minute later when Bev reported that he was going to be short.

From the investigation we have found that there was no actual fire and that the engine had been secured. We are convinced that Bev felt that he could make the field in a "flameout" (no power) landing. By the time he realized he could not make the runway he was over a housing area. He was high enough to eject at this point but he elected to ride the plane into the trees rather than endanger the people below

Awards and decorations
 

Legacy
A street in the Conrad Heights neighborhood of Patuxent River Naval Air Station is named in his honor.

Family history
Randolph's parents and grandparents were from Virginia. His father was Percy Charrington Randolph and his mother was Jean McNeil Carson.

References

"Grumman F-11A Tiger Ejection History"

1923 births
1958 deaths
Accidental deaths in Maryland
American Korean War pilots
United States Navy personnel of the Korean War
Aviators killed in aviation accidents or incidents in the United States
People from Millwood, Virginia
United States Naval Aviators
United States Navy officers
Recipients of the Air Medal